Una tarde cualquiera is an Argentine TV program hosted by El Bahiano.

Nominations

 2013 Martín Fierro Awards
 Best program for kids

Columnists

Agostina Concilio
Daniel Wizenberg
Daniela Katz
Cristián Domínguez
Sonsoles Segovia
Irene Miguez
Tania Chávez
Chiara Mezza.

References

Argentine children's television series
Televisión Pública original programming
2013 Argentine television series debuts